The Swedish Football Association (SvFF) is the governing and body of football in Sweden. It organises the football leagues – Allsvenskan for men and Damallsvenskan for women – and the men's and women's national teams. It is based in Solna and is a founding member of both FIFA and UEFA. SvFF is supported by 24 district organisations.

Background 

Svenska Fotbollförbundet (SvFF) (English:Swedish Football Association) was founded in Stockholm on 18 December 1904 and is the sports federation responsible for the promotion and administration of organised football in Sweden and also represents the country outside Sweden. SvFF is affiliated to the Swedish Sports Confederation (RF) and the Fédération Internationale de Football Association (FIFA) and Union of European Football Associations (UEFA).

Karl-Erik Nilsson has been the President since 2012. In 2009 there were 3,359 clubs affiliated to the Svenska Fotbollförbundet with a total of more than a million members, of whom about 500,000 were active players. Together, they accounted for almost one third of the total Swedish sports movement activities.

SvFF administers the Swedish men's respectively women's national football teams, other football teams and leagues including the Allsvenskan and Superettan. The motto of Swedish football – "one club in every village, football for all" – is reflected in the democratic constitution of Swedish football. All football competition in the nation is arranged by the SvFF and its 24 district organisations. The clubs are voting members at the annual meetings of the district organisations. The district organisations and the elite clubs are entitled to vote at the F.A.'s general meeting.

SvFF was the sole owner of Sweden's national stadium, the Råsunda Stadium in Solna, from 1999 until it was replaced in 2012 by Friends Arena, located about 1 kilometer away and also in Solna. SvFF is the lead partner in the consortium that owns the current stadium, and maintains its offices there (as it did at the prior stadium).

The Swedish Football Association Football Gala is held annually in November since 2005. It includes the award for the best male player (Guldbollen) and female players (Diamantbollen).

SvFF had a turnover 2008 of 554 MSEK.

Early history 

The first Swedish national football championship was played in 1896 but it was 7 years later in 1903 that the Riksidrottsförbundet was formed which was to be the precursor to the Svenska Fotbollförbundet.  The new organisation had a football and hockey section (hockey being the term for bandy at that time and not ice hockey or field hockey). In 1904 Sweden was one of 7 nations that founded FIFA. It also introduced ice hockey to Sweden in 1920, before the 1922 establishment of the Swedish Ice Hockey Association. Before the 1925 establishment of the Swedish Bandy Association, the Swedish Football Association also administered organized bandy in Sweden.

In 1906, the name Svenska Fotbollförbundet (Swedish Football Association) was officially accepted and the following year SvFF was officially voted into FIFA. On 12 July 1908, Sweden's first international match was played in which Norway were defeated 11–3 in Gothenburg. However the Olympics were a disappointment for Sweden, losing 1–12 to England and 0–2 to the Netherlands.

Competitions 

Svenska Fotbollförbundet is responsible for organising the following competitions:

Men's football
Allsvenskan (Tier 1)
Superettan (Tier 2)
Division 1 (Tier 3) – two sections
Division 2 (Tier 4) – six sections
Division 3 (Tier 5) – twelve sections
 Folksam utvecklingsserie – two sections

Women's football
Damallsvenskan (Tier 1)
Elitettan (Tier 2)
Division 1 Norrettan (Tier 3)
Division 1 Söderettan (Tier 3)
Division 2 (Tier 4) – nine sections

Junior
Juniorallsvenskan
Pojkallsvenskan

Cups
Svenska Cupen – Men
Svenska Cupen – Women
CANAL+-cupen – Junior Boys
Cup Kommunal – Junior Girls

Honours

Men's
FIFA World Cup
Runners-up (1958)
Third place (1950, 1994)

Olympic Games
Winners (1948)
Third place (1924, 1952)

FIFA U-17 World Cup
 Third place (2013)

UEFA European Under-21 Championship
 Winners (2015)
 Runners-up (1992)

Women's
FIFA Women's World Cup
 Runners-up (2003)
 Third place (1991, 2011, 2019)

Olympic Games
 Runners-up (2016)

UEFA Women's Championship
 Winners (1984)
 Runners-up (1987, 1995, 2001)

UEFA Women's Under-19 Championship
 Winners (1999, 2012, 2015)
 Runners-up (2009)

UEFA Women's Under-17 Championship
 Runners-up (2013)

District Football Associations 
Swedish football is built on a single pyramid league system.  While the SvFF administers the top leagues, the 24 district or regional associations administers youth football and the lower-tier leagues from Division 4 (men) and Division 3 (women), respectively, and further below.

The 24 district organisations are as follows:

Blekinge Fotbollförbund
Bohusläns Fotbollförbund
Dalarnas Fotbollförbund
Dalslands Fotbollförbund
Gestriklands Fotbollförbund
Göteborgs Fotbollförbund
Gotlands Fotbollförbund
Hallands Fotbollförbund
Hälsinglands Fotbollförbund
Jämtland-Härjedalens Fotbollförbund
Medelpads Fotbollförbund
Norrbottens Fotbollförbund
Skånes Fotbollförbund
Smålands Fotbollförbund
Södermanlands Fotbollförbund
Stockholms Fotbollförbund
Upplands Fotbollförbund
Värmlands Fotbollförbund
Västerbottens Fotbollförbund
Västergötlands Fotbollförbund
Västmanlands Fotbollförbund
Ångermanlands Fotbollförbund
Örebro Läns Fotbollförbund
Östergötlands Fotbollförbund

Footnotes

External links 

Swedish Football Association (official website)
 Sweden at FIFA site
 Sweden at UEFA site

 
Sweden
Association
Football governing bodies in Sweden
1904 establishments in Sweden
Sports organizations established in 1904
Defunct bandy governing bodies
Defunct ice hockey governing bodies